is a railway station on the Hokuriku Main Line in the city of Hakusan, Ishikawa, Japan, operated by West Japan Railway Company (JR West).

Lines

Station layout
The station consists of two opposed unnumbered side platforms connected by a level crossing. The station is unattended.

Platforms

Adjacent stations

History
Komaiko Station opened on 10 April 1964, although a temporary signal stop had existed since 20 June 1903. With the privatization of Japanese National Railways (JNR) on 1 April 1987, the station came under the control of JR West.

Surrounding area
Tedori River

See also
 List of railway stations in Japan

External links

  

Stations of West Japan Railway Company
Railway stations in Ishikawa Prefecture
Railway stations in Japan opened in 1964
Hokuriku Main Line
Hakusan, Ishikawa